The 2nd BRDC International Trophy meeting – formally the International Daily Express Trophy – was held on 26 August 1950 at the Silverstone Circuit, England. The race was run to Formula One regulations, and was held over two heats of 15 laps each, followed by a final race of 35 laps. Italian driver Nino Farina emerged the winner, in an Alfa Romeo 158, repeating his victory from the 1950 British Grand Prix, held at the same circuit in May. He beat his Argentine team-mate Juan Manuel Fangio, and British driver Peter Whitehead in a Ferrari. Other notable entrants were the two BRM V16 cars entered for Raymond Sommer, Peter Walker, Raymond Mays and Reg Parnell. However, their legendary lack of reliability resulted in neither car completing a lap in anger.

Results

Final – 35 Laps

Fastest lap: Nino Farina and Juan Manuel Fangio – 1:52

Heats – 15 Laps
(Note: Drivers indicated in bold qualified for the final)

References

BRDC International Trophy
BRDC International Trophy
BRDC International Trophy
BRDC International Trophy